Steven Thomas Ross (4 July 1937 – 12 August 2018) was an American military historian.

Steven Thomas Ross was born to Ruth Berlin Ross and Michael Bakunin Ross and raised in Hewlett, New York. Ross graduated from Williams College and earned a doctorate from Princeton University and taught at the University of Nebraska and the University of Texas before joining the United States Naval War College faculty, where he remained for thirty years and was named the William V. Pratt Chair in Military History. He also served as a visiting professor at Yale University and Williams College, worked for the Defense Intelligence Agency as a military analyst and was a scholar-in-residence at the Central Intelligence Agency. His knowledge, enthusiasm for teaching and candor contributed to the education of three generations of military leaders. He was awarded the United States Navy Meritorious Civilian Service Award.

He died on 12 August 2018, aged 81, and was buried at Beth Olam Cemetery on Wyatt Road in Middletown, Rhode Island.

Publications
 European diplomatic history, 1789-1815 : France against Europe (1969, 1981)
 The French Revolution : conflict or continuity? (1971) 
 Quest for victory: French military strategy, 1792-1799 (1973)
 From Flintlock to Rifle : infantry tactics, 1740-1866 (1979) 
 French military history, 1661-1799 : a guide to the literature (1984)
 Napoleon and maneuver warfare (1985) 
 American war plans, 1945-1950 (1988)
 American war plans, 1941-1945: the test of battle (1997)
 Historical dictionary of the wars of the French Revolution (1998) 
 U.S. war plans, 1939-1945 (2000) 
 American war plans, 1890-1939 (2002)

References

1937 births
2018 deaths
American military historians
20th-century American historians
American male non-fiction writers
21st-century American historians
21st-century American male writers
Princeton University alumni
Williams College alumni
University of Nebraska faculty
University of Texas faculty
Naval War College faculty
People from Hewlett, New York
Writers from Newport, Rhode Island
Historians from New York (state)
20th-century American male writers
Historians from Rhode Island